Manuel Silva Acevedo (born 1942) is a Chilean poet. He won the National Prize for Literature in 2016.

References

Living people
1942 births
Writers from Santiago
University of Chile alumni
Chilean male poets
National Prize for Literature (Chile) winners
20th-century Chilean poets
20th-century Chilean male writers
21st-century Chilean poets
21st-century Chilean male writers